Prince Of Wales is an island locality in the Shire of Torres, Queensland, Australia.

Geography 
The locality consists of a number of islands, the largest two are Prince Of Wales Island (Indigenous name: Muralug Island) and Entrance Island (Indigenous name: Zuna Island).

The town of Muralug is on the north-eastern tip of Prince Of Wales Island.

History 
The locality takes its name from Prince Of Wales Island, which in turn was named on 23 August 1770 by Lieutenant James Cook on HMS Endeavour presumably after George Augustus Frederick of Hanover, the then Prince of Wales (later King George IV).

Education 
There are no schools on the island. The nearest primary and secondary schools are on Thursday Island.

References

External links 
 

Shire of Torres
Towns in Queensland
Localities in Queensland